The Right of the Weakest is a 2006 Belgian drama film directed by Lucas Belvaux. It was entered into the 2006 Cannes Film Festival.

Cast
 Eric Caravaca as Patrick
 Lucas Belvaux as Marc Pirmet
 Claude Semal as Robert
 Patrick Descamps as Jean-Pierre
 Natacha Régnier as Carole
 Elie Belvaux as Steve
 Gilbert Melki as Le ferrailleur

References

External links

2006 films
2000s French-language films
2006 drama films
Films directed by Lucas Belvaux
Belgian drama films
French-language Belgian films